The Peru women's national volleyball team was one of the dominant forces in women's volleyball in the 1980s, culminating in the silver medal won at the 1988 Summer Olympics in Seoul, South Korea.
The team's nickname is Las Hijas del Sol (Sun's daughters)

Current squad
As of July 2022

 Coach:  Francisco Hervás 
 Assistant coach:  Walter Lung 
 Girls Youth Categories Coach:  Elena Keldibekova
 Women Junior Categories Coach:  Walter Lung

Results

Summer Olympics

 Champions   Runners-up   Third place   Fourth place

World Championship

 Champions   Runners up   Third place   Fourth place

World Cup

 Champions   Runners up   Third place   Fourth place

World Grand Prix
 Champions   Runners up   Third place   Fourth place

Pan American Games

 Champions   Runners up   Third place   Fourth place

Pan American Cup

 Champions   Runners-up   Third place   Fourth place

South American Championship
 Champions   Runners up   Third place   Fourth place

Squads

Olympic Games
 Mexico 1968 — 4th place
 Olga Asato, Irma Cordero, Luisa Fuentes, Esperanza Jiménez, Teresa Nuñez, Ana María Ramírez, Aida Reyna, Alicia Sánchez, and Norma Velarde.
 Montreal 1976 — 7th place
 Gaby Cárdeñas, Ana Cecilia Carrillo, Luisa Cervera, Irma Cordero, Delia Córdova, María del Risco, Luisa Fuentes, Mercedes González, Luisa Merea, Teresa Núñez, María Ostolaza, and Silvia Quevedo.
 Moscow 1980 — 6th place
 Gaby Cárdeñas, Ana Cecilia Carrillo, Raquel Chumpitaz, María del Risco, Denisse Fajardo, Rosa García, Aurora Heredia, Silvia León, Natalia Malaga, Carmen Pimentel, Cecilia Tait and Gina Torrealva
 Los Angeles 1984 — 4th place
 Luisa Cervera, Ana Chaparro, María del Risco, Denisse Fajardo, Miriam Gallardo, Rosa García, Sonia Heredia, Natalia Málaga, Gabriela Pérez del Solar, Carmen Pimentel, Cecilia Tait, and Gina Torrealva.
 Seoul 1988 —  Silver Medal
 Luisa Cervera, Alejandra de la Guerra, Denisse Fajardo, Miriam Gallardo, Rosa García, Sonia Heredia, Katherine Horny, Natalia Málaga, Gabriela Pérez del Solar, Cecilia Tait, Gina Torrealva, and Cenaida Uribe.
 Atlanta 1996 — 11th place
 Luren Baylon, Milagros Cámere, Leyla Chihuán, Verónica Contreras, Yolanda Delgado, Iris Falcón, Sara Joya, Sandra Rodriguez, Milagros Moy, Paola Ramos, Marjorie Vilchez, and Yulissa Zamudio. Head coach: Park Jong-Dug.
 Sydney 2000 — 11th place
 Fiorella Aita, Milagros Cámere, Leyla Chihuán, Iris Falcón, Rosa García, Elena Keldibekova, Natalia Málaga, Milagros Moy, Patricia Soto, Jessenia Uceda, Janet Vasconzuelos, and Yulissa Zamudio. Head coach: Park Man-bok.

World Championships
 Brazil 1960 — 7th place
 Unknown
 Japan 1967 — 4th place
 Unknown
 Bulgaria 1970 — 15th place
 Unknown
 Mexico 1974 — 8th place
 Unknown
 URSS 1978 — 10th place
 Unknown
 Peru 1982 —  Silver Medal
 Gaby Cárdeñas, Ana Cecilia Carrillo, Raquel Chumpitaz, María del Risco, Denisse Fajardo, Rosa García, Aurora Heredia, Silvia León, Natalia Málaga, Carmen Pimentel, Cecilia Tait, and Gina Torrealva.
 Czechoslovakia 1986 —  Bronze Medal
 Sonia Ayaucán, Cenaida Uribe, Rosa Garcia, Miriam Gallardo, Gabriela Perez del Solar, Sonia Heredia, Cecilia Tait, Luisa Cervera, Denisse Fajardo, Ana Arostegui, Gina Torrealva, and Natalia Malaga.
 China 1990 — 6th place
 Sonia Ayaucán, Cenaida Uribe, Rosa Garcia, Miriam Gallardo, Gabriela Perez del Solar, Jessica Tejada, Milagros Cámere, Yolanda Delgado, Sammy Duarte, Paola Paz Soldan, Janet Vasconzuelos, and Natalia Malaga.
 Brazil 1994 — 13th place
 Luren Baylon, Verónica Contreras, Milagros Cámere, Iris Falcón, Miriam Gallardo, Rosa García, Sara Joya, Milagros Moy, Natalia Málaga, Sandra Rodriguez, Janet Vasconzuelos and Yulissa Zamudio
 Japan 1998 — 10th place
 Fiorella Aita, Luren Baylon, Milagros Cámere, Yvon Cancino, Elizabeth Castillo, Sahara Castillo, Leyla Chihuán, Iris Falcón, Roxana Huamán, Jessica Tejada, Patricia Soto and Yulissa Zamudio.
 Japan 2006 — 17th place
 Luren Baylon, Leyla Chihuán, Verónica Contreras, Sara Joya, Elena Keldibekova, Milagros Moy, Vanessa Palacios, Natalia Romanova, Patricia Soto, Carla Tristán, Mirtha Uribe and Yulissa Zamudio.
 Japan 2010 — 15th place
 Angélica Aquino, Leyla Chihuán, Paola García, Elena Keldibekova, Zoila La Rosa, Karla Ortiz, Vanessa Palacios, Carla Rueda, Patricia Soto, Jessenia Uceda, Mirtha Uribe and Yulissa Zamudio. Head coach: Cheol-Yeong Kim.

World Grand Prix

 Shanghai 1994 — 11th place
 Unknown
 Macau 2011 — 16th place
 Angélica Aquino, Luren Baylon, Elena Keldibekova, Alexandra Muñoz, Karla Ortiz, Vanessa Palacios, Carla Rueda, Jessenia Uceda, Daniela Uribe, Mirtha Uribe, Clarivett Yllescas and Yulissa Zamudio. Head coach: Luca Cristofani.

Pan-American Cups
 Puerto Rico 2006 — 6th place
  Luren Baylón, Leyla Chihuán, Verónica Contreras, Teresa de la Borda, Gisella Duarte, Sara Joya, Elena Keldibekova, Vanessa Palacios, Natalia Romanova, Patricia Soto, Mirtha Uribe and Yulissa Zamudio. Head coach: Carlos Aparicio.
 Mexico 2007 — 7th place
 Luren Baylón, Leyla Chihuán, Verónica Contreras, Sara Joya, Elena Keldibekova, Vanessa Palacios, Pietra Schiappa, Patricia Soto, Carla Tristán, Jessenia Uceda, Mirtha Uribe and Yulissa Zamudio. Head coach: Enio de Figueiredo.
 Mexico 2008 — 7th place
Yvon Cancino, Veronica Contreras, Kely Culquimboz, Sara Joya, Vanessa Palacios, Carla Rueda, Erika Salazar, Patricia Soto, Carla Tristán, Jessenia Uceda, Mirtha Uribe and Yulissa Zamudio. Head coach: José dos Santos.
 USA 2009 — 5th place
 Angélica Aquino, Leyla Chihuán, Paola García, Elena Keldibekova, Zoila La Rosa, Karla Ortiz, Vanessa Palacios, Carla Rueda, Patricia Soto, Jessenia Uceda, Mirtha Uribe and Yulissa Zamudio. Head coach: Cheol Yong Kim.
 Mexico 2010 —  Silver Medal
 Angélica Aquino, Leyla Chihuán, Paola García, Elena Keldibekova, Zoila La Rosa, Karla Ortiz, Vanessa Palacios, Carla Rueda, Patricia Soto, Jessenia Uceda, Mirtha Uribe and Yulissa Zamudio. Head coach: Cheol Yong Kim.
 Mexico 2011 — 8th place
 Angélica Aquino, Luren Baylon, Paola García, Elena Keldibekova, Zoila La Rosa, Karla Ortiz, Vanessa Palacios, Carla Rueda, Patricia Soto, Mirtha Uribe and Yulissa Zamudio. Head coach: Luca Cristofani.
 Mexico 2012 — 7th Place
 Angélica Aquino, Raffaella Camet, Elena Keldibekova, Ángela Leyva, Ginna Lopez, Alexandra Muñoz, Karla Ortiz, Vanessa Palacios, Carla Rueda, Daniela Uribe, Mirtha Uribe and Clarivett Yllescas. Head coach: Edwin Jimenez.
 Peru 2013 — 8th Place
 María de Fátima Acosta, Angélica Aquino, Raffaella Camet, Grecia Herrada, Alexandra Muñoz, Zoila La Rosa, Karla Ortiz, Patricia Soto, Janice Torres, Mirtha Uribe, Clarivett Yllescas and Yulissa Zamudio. Head coach: Sung-Jin Hong.

South American Championships
 Porto Alegre 2009 —  Bronze Medal
 Angélica Aquino, Raffaella Camet, Leyla Chihuan, Paola García, Elena Keldibekova, Zoila La Rosa, Karla Ortiz, Vanessa Palacios, Carla Rueda, Patricia Soto, Jessenia Uceda and Clarivett Yllescas. Head coach: Cheol-Yeong Kim.
 Lima 2011 —  Bronze Medal
 Angélica Aquino, Luren Baylon, Elena Keldibekova, Alexandra Muñoz, Karla Ortiz, Vanessa Palacios, Carla Rueda, Patricia Soto, Jessenia Uceda, Mirtha Uribe, Clarivett Yllescas and Yulissa Zamudio. Head coach: Luca Cristofani.
 Ica 2013 —  Bronze Medal
 María de Fátima Acosta, Angélica Aquino, Raffaella Camet, Grecia Herrada, Zoila La Rosa, Alexandra Muñoz, Karla Ortiz, Vanessa Palacios, Mirtha Uribe, Clarivett Yllescas and Yulissa Zamudio. Head coach: Luca Cristofani.
 Cartagena 2015 —  Silver Medal
 Susan Egoavil, Angela Leyva, Katherine Regalado, Mabel Olemar, Maricarmen Guerrero, Alexandra Muñoz, Coraima Gomez, Esmeralda Sanchez, Mirtha Uribe, Clarivett Yllescas, Nair Canessa and Diana De la Peña. Head coach: Mauro Marasciulo.

See also
Peru women's national under-23 volleyball team
Peru women's national under-20 volleyball team
Peru women's national under-18 volleyball team

Liga Nacional Superior de Voleibol
Volleyball Copa Latina

Videos
 CUBA Vs PERÚ COPA PANAMERICANA 2015 Partido Completo. Youtube.com video

References
Washington Post Article
Sports123
Squads

National women's volleyball teams
Women's volleyball in Peru
Volleyball